Kuopio Airport  is an airport in Rissala, Siilinjärvi, Finland, about  north of Kuopio city centre. It is the fifth busiest airport in Finland, as measured by the number of passengers (ca. 235,411 (2017).

History
Kuopio Airport was completed in November 1939 and flight operations started in May 1940. It was used by the Luftwaffe during World War II (1942–43). During the Continuation War the runways were made from plywood. The first terminal building was opened in 1949 before a new one replaced it in 1971. In 2004, Kuopio Airport was chosen as the Airport of the Year in Finland. , Kuopio Airport was one of only five profitable airports in Finland, thanks to shared use of the runways by the Karelian Air Command of the Finnish Air Force and civilian airlines. Kuopio had its first international scheduled route when AirBaltic operated direct flights to Riga in 2008–2011.

Lake terminal

A unique airport Lake terminal was completed in March 2008 (at ). The terminal is situated  walk distance from the airport terminal. It connects the airport to Lake Saimaa region.

Lake Saimaa offers a waterway connection to the cities of the Finnish Lakeland: Imatra, Joensuu, Kuopio, Lappeenranta, Mikkeli, Savonlinna and Varkaus. Vuoksi River flows from Saimaa to Lake Ladoga (Russia). Saimaa Canal connects Saimaa with the Gulf of Finland.

There is no scheduled daily boat line here, but tour operators can use the terminal.

Airlines and destinations

Statistics

Finnish Air Force
Kuopio Airport is also home of the Finnish Air Force's Karelian Air Command and the Fighter Squadron 31 (HävLLv 31).

Accidents and incidents
 On 3 October 1978, Douglas C-47A DO-10 of the Finnish Air Force crashed into Lake Juurusvesi when attempting to return to Kuopio Airport. The aircraft was on a military flight to Helsinki Airport when an engine failed shortly after take-off and the decision was made to return to Kuopio. 15 people lost their lives in the crash.

Ground transportation

See also 
List of the largest airports in the Nordic countries

References

External links

Kuopio Airport – Official website
AIP Finland – Kuopio Airport

Airports in Finland
Airport
Airport
Buildings and structures in North Savo
Finnish Air Force bases
International airports in Finland